Ligaria is a genus of flowering plants belonging to the family Loranthaceae.

Its native range is Peru to Brazil and Southern South America.

Species:

Ligaria cuneifolia 
Ligaria teretiflora

References

Loranthaceae
Loranthaceae genera